Gavin Broder (born 1959) is the former Chief Rabbi of Ireland, serving from 1996 to October, 2000.

Broder left Dublin in October 2000 to become London chaplain of Hillel, the Jewish student organization. He was inaugurated chief rabbi in 1996, at the age of 34, at the Adelaide Road Synagogue.

See also
History of the Jews in Ireland

References

External links
Jewish Student Chaplain for London Rabbi Gavin Broder

1959 births
20th-century rabbis
21st-century rabbis
Chief rabbis of Ireland
Living people